Captain Stuart Hugh Minto Russell (18 January 1909 – 30 October 1943) was a Conservative Party politician in the United Kingdom.

Early life 
Stuart Hugh Minto Russell was born on 18 January 1909 to Sir Charles Lennox Somerville Russell and Lady Russell (née Elliot) from Crooksbury Hurst in Surrey. For his education he attended Rugby School.

Member of Parliament

1935 general election 

Russell stood as Conservative candidate in the Parliamentary constituency of Darwen in Lancashire at the 1935 General Election. He stood to become a Member of Parliament (MP) against Liberal Party leader (and sitting MP) Herbert Samuel and a Labour candidate. The local party chairman, Colonel Felix Knowles, telegraphed Stanley Baldwin to query the Liberal Party statements that Baldwin would like to see Herbert Samuel returned as MP. In response, Baldwin telegraphed -

He was described by The Times as 'a young man with a personality' and so impressed the Conservative candidate selection committee in Darwen that they started a fund for his campaign. It was the first time that the constituency party had ever established a fund for a candidate.

Parliamentary service

Maiden speech 
After entering the House of Commons, Russell's maiden speech on 22 April 1936 in a debate of the question, "That it is expedient to amend the law relating to the National Debt, Customs and Inland Revenue (including Excise) and to make further provision in connection with finance".

He rose at 16.59 began his first remarks to the house -

Italian invasion of Abyssinia 

Following the Italian invasion of Abyssinia, the Labour Party put forward a vote of censure due to the government's handling of the crisis. The vote took place on 23 June 1936 with the motion of censure defeated by 384 to 170. The Times noted that Russell felt that, "the Government were blessed for having kept an unprepared nation out of a European war fought on behalf of the League".

Working hours 
He spoke in general support of a reduction of working hours with the proviso that, "...this can be done without determent to the prosperity of the industry concerned". He also supported, "...the action of His Majesty's Government in resisting proposals which would endanger the earnings of British workers".

Parliamentary Private Secretary 
Russell was Parliamentary Private Secretary to the Under Secretary of State for Air, Sir Phillip Sassoon between 1936 and 1937. He also served as Parliamentary Private Secretary to the Chancellor of the Exchequer between 1937 and 1938. He resigned from this position so he could speak freely in support of the Prime Minister's foreign policy.

Second World War

Norway Debate 

Russell attended the Norway Debate, voting against the government. In the Commons Dining Room, the Chancellor of the Exchequer Sir John Simon approached Russell and Somerset de Chair at their table. Sir John asked, "May I ask which way you young people are going to vote?" To this, de Chair replied, "Against you".

Military service and death 
In 1943, Russell died on active service at El Alamein, Egypt, as a captain of the Coldstream Guards in World War II, aged 34. He rests in the care of the Commonwealth War Graves Commission at Alexandria (Hadra) War Memorial Cemetery. His brother, Lieutenant Raymond Lennox Somerville, also died while on active service on 17 July 1941 at the age of 28.

After his death, the by-election for his seat was won by the Conservative candidate Captain Stanley Prescott.

References

Further reading 

1909 births
1943 deaths
Coldstream Guards officers
British Army personnel killed in World War II
Conservative Party (UK) MPs for English constituencies
UK MPs 1935–1945
Military personnel from Surrey
Politicians from Surrey